World Youth Day 2023 will be a Catholic festival held in Lisbon, Portugal, and was originally scheduled to be celebrated in summer 2022. This was announced by Pope Francis and Bishop Kevin Farrell at the end of the closing Mass of World Youth Day 2019 in Panama City, Panama.  Originally scheduled to be held from 2–7 August 2022, the Holy See announced on April 20, 2020, that it will be postponed until August 2023 due to the COVID-19 pandemic, and rescheduled for 1–6 August 2023.

Host city
In the celebration that marked the closing of the World Youth Day 2019 in Panama City, in the presence of thousands of young people from all over the world, including 300 Portuguese young people, were the Patriarch of Lisbon, Manuel Clemente, the president of the Portuguese Republic, Marcelo Rebelo de Sousa, the secretary of state for Youth and Sports, João Paulo Rebelo, representing the Government of Portugal, and the mayor of Lisbon, Fernando Medina, as well as ambassadors, six bishops (from the dioceses of Lisbon, Guarda, Coimbra, Braga and Bragança-Miranda) and several priests. In a press conference, the president of the Episcopal Conference of Portugal (CEP) said that he expects to receive between 1 and 2 million young people in the summer of 2022 and added that the "more than probable" place for the conclusive events of WYD 2022 will be the margin north of the Tagus river, next to the Sea of Palha, in Lisbon, and that evokes the Sea of Galilee where Jesus walked.

Although the main event takes place next to the Parque do Tejo in Lisbon, are also expected pilgrimages from the participating youth to the National Sanctuary of Cristo Rei, in Almada, to the Sanctuary of Our Lady of Fatima, in Cova da Iria, and also to the birthplace of Anthony of Lisbon.

Patrons and Intercessors

Patronage

The patrons of the World Youth Day 2023 are Catholic figures who, in their youth, have taken decisive steps in the path of holiness:
 Francisco and Jacinta Marto (Messengers of Our Lady of Fatima)
 Mary of the Divine Heart (Sister of the Good Shepherd and Messenger of the Sacred Heart of Jesus)
 Alexandrina of Balazar (Salesian Cooperator and Messenger of the Immaculate Heart of Mary)

Intercessors
 Anthony of Lisbon (Franciscan friar and Doctor of the Church)
 Beatrice of Silva (conception nun and founder of the Order of the Immaculate Conception)
 Elizabeth of Portugal (Queen of Portugal and nun of the Order of Saint Claire)
 John de Britto (Jesuit missionary and Martyr of the Catholic Church)
 John of God (Founder of the Hospitaller Order)
 The Holy Martyrs of Lisbon (Saints Verissimus, Máxima, and Julia)
 Nuno of Saint Mary (Constable of the Kingdom of Portugal and Carmelite friar)
 Theotonius of Coimbra (Co-founder of the Regular Canons of the Holy Cross)
 Amadeus of Portugal (Franciscan friar and Reformer of the conventual life)
 Gundisalvus of Amarante (Dominican Friar and Confessor)
 Maria Clara of the Child Jesus (Foundress of the Congregation of the Franciscan Hospitaller Sisters of the Immaculate Conception)
 Mafalda of Portugal (Queen consort of Castile and Cistercian nun)
 Sancha of Portugal (Princess of Portugal and Cistercian nun)
 Theresa of Portugal (Queen Consort of Léon and Cistercian nun)
 Rita Amada de Jesus (Foundress of the Institute of the Sisters of Jesus Mary and Joseph)
 Forty Martyrs of Brazil (Missionary martyrs of the Society of Jesus)
 Mother Virginia Brites of the Passion (Poor clare nun and Messenger of the Immaculate Heart of Mary)
 Sãozinha of Alenquer (Young Catholic of popular devotion in Portugal)

Devotion
The sculpture number 1 of the Pilgrim Virgin of Fatima traveled, in the early hours of 21 January 2019, to Panama to be present at the World Youth Day 2019, evoking the memory of the Marian imprint that Pope John Paul II wished to print at the creation of these great Catholic religious events. Continuing this spirit, at the World Youth Day 2023 the young people will be especially invited to pray and to deepen the main devotion recommended in the apparitions of the Blessed Virgin Mary at the Cova da Iria, in Fatima, in particular the prayer of the Holy Rosary.

Theme
On 22 June 2019, Pope Francis announced that the theme of the event will be “Mary arose and went with haste” (Lk 1:39). This Bible verse also takes into account the start of her visitation with her cousin Elizabeth. The pope also called on Catholics to prepare for the 2023 World Youth Day by meditating on two scriptural passages: Luke 7:14, “Young man, I say to you, Arise!”; and a re-working of Acts 26:16, “Stand up. I appoint you as a witness of what you have seen”.

References

External links
 World Youth Day 2023

2023
Pope Francis
Catholic Church in Portugal
2023 in Portugal
2023 in Christianity
History of Lisbon
Scheduled events